This is a list of the candidates for the offices of President of the United States and Vice President of the United States of the Green Party of the United States. Opponents who received over one percent of the popular vote or ran an official campaign that received Electoral College votes are listed. Offices held prior to Election Day are included, and those held on Election Day have an italicized end date.

List of Green Party presidential tickets

1996, 2000

2004

2008

2012, 2016

2020

See also
List of United States Democratic Party presidential tickets
List of United States Republican Party presidential tickets
List of United States Libertarian Party presidential tickets

Notes

References

Green
United States Green Party presidential tickets